Bidor Bypass, Federal Route 321 is a federal road bypass in Bidor, Perak, Malaysia linking Pekan Pasir at Federal Route 1 to Jeram Mengkuang at Federal Route 58. The road also act as an bypass for Bidor town.

Route background
The Kilometre Zero of the Federal Route 321 is located at Pekan Pasir, at its interchange with the Federal Route 1, the main trunk road of the central of Peninsular Malaysia.

At most sections, the Federal Route 321 was built under the JKR R5 road standard, allowing maximum speed limit of up to 90 km/h.

List of junctions and towns

References

Malaysian Federal Roads
Highways in Malaysia
Bypasses